The 1991 Grand Prix motorcycle racing season was the 43rd F.I.M. Road Racing World Championship season.

Season summary

The beginning of the 1990s marked a golden age for Grand Prix motorcycle racing. The rivalry between Wayne Rainey and Kevin Schwantz was in full flow while Mick Doohan started to come into his own. Eddie Lawson had switched to Cagiva and started to have some respectable results. In a one-year quirk, only 13 races counted as, competitors were allowed to drop their two worst scores. The Yugoslavia round was dropped because of the civil war and replaced with a Grand Prix of Europe at Jarama. The Brazilian round was also dropped at the last minute over track safety concerns and replaced with a race held at Le Mans. The inaugural Malaysian Grand Prix was held at Shah Alam.

For the 1991 season, Michelin decided to supply only the Rothmans Honda team with tires; everybody else used Dunlops.

Luca Cadalora won the 250 title in a dominating fashion with eight wins. In the 125 class, Italian teenager Loris Capirossi swept to the title for the second consecutive year.

1991 Grand Prix season calendar
The following Grands Prix were scheduled to take place in 1991:

Calendar changes
 The Australian Grand Prix was moved forward, from 16 September to 7 April.
 The German Grand Prix moved from the Nürburgring to the Hockenheimring.
 The Yugoslavian Grand Prix was cancelled due to the ongoing Yugoslav Wars.
 The Brazilian Grand Prix was initially scheduled, but was cancelled on the last moment due to poor safety standards of the venue.
 The Belgian, Swedish and Hungarian Grand Prix were taken off the calendar due to organisational and other type of problems.
 The European Grand Prix was added to the calendar as a replacement for the Yugoslavian Grand Prix.
 The San Marino Grand Prix returned after a three-year absence on the Mugello circuit.
 The French Grand Prix moved from the Bugatti Circuit in Le Mans to the Paul Ricard circuit.
 The Vitesse du Mans Grand Prix was added as a one-off Grand Prix to replace the Brazilian Grand Prix and was held on the Bugatti Circuit in Le Mans.
 The Malaysian Grand Prix was added to the calendar.

1991 Grand Prix season results

Grands Prix

Participants

500cc participants

250cc participants

125cc participants

Results and standings

500cc riders' standings

Scoring system
Points are awarded to the top fifteen finishers. A rider has to finish the race to earn points.

250cc riders' standings

Scoring system
Points are awarded to the top fifteen finishers. A rider has to finish the race to earn points.